In biology, a strain is a genetic variant, a subtype or a culture within a biological species. Strains are often seen as inherently artificial concepts, characterized by a specific intent for genetic isolation. This is most easily observed in microbiology where strains are derived from a single cell colony and are typically quarantined by the physical constraints of a Petri dish. Strains are also commonly referred to within virology, botany, and with rodents used in experimental studies.

Microbiology and virology 

It has been said that "there is no universally accepted definition for the terms 'strain', 'variant', and 'isolate' in the virology community, and most virologists simply copy the usage of terms from others".

A strain is a genetic variant or subtype of a microorganism (e.g., a virus, bacterium or fungus). For example, a "flu strain" is a certain biological form of the influenza or "flu" virus. These flu strains are characterized by their differing isoforms of surface proteins. New viral strains can be created due to mutation or swapping of genetic components when two or more viruses infect the same cell in nature. These phenomena are known respectively as antigenic drift and antigenic shift. Microbial strains can also be differentiated by their genetic makeup using metagenomic methods to maximize resolution within species. This has become a valuable tool to analyze the microbiome.

Artificial constructs 
Scientists have modified strains of viruses in order to study their behavior, as in the case of the H5N1 influenza virus. While funding for such research has aroused controversy at times due to safety concerns, leading to a temporary pause, it has subsequently proceeded.

In biotechnology, microbial strains have been constructed to establish metabolic pathways suitable for treating a variety of applications. Historically, a major effort of metabolic research has been devoted to the field of biofuel production. Escherichia coli is most common species for prokaryotic strain engineering. Scientists have succeeded in establishing viable minimal genomes from which new strains can be developed. These minimal strains provide a near guarantee that experiments on genes outside the minimal framework will not be effected by non-essential pathways. Optimized strains of E. coli are typically used for this application. E. coli are also often used as a chassis for the expression of simple proteins. These strains, such as BL21, are genetically modified to minimize protease activity, hence enabling potential for high efficiency industrial scale protein production.

Strains of yeasts are the most common subjects of eukaryotic genetic modification, especially with respect to industrial fermentation.

Plants 
The term has no official ranking status in botany; the term refers to the collective descendants produced from a common ancestor that share a uniform morphological or physiological character. A strain is a designated group of offspring that are either descended from a modified plant (produced by conventional breeding or by biotechnological means), or which result from genetic mutation.

As an example, some rice strains are made by inserting new genetic material into a rice plant, all the descendants of the genetically modified rice plant are a strain with unique genetic information that is passed on to later generations; the strain designation, which is normally a number or a formal name, covers all the plants that descend from the originally modified plant. The rice plants in the strain can be bred to other rice strains or cultivars, and if desirable plants are produced, these are further bred to stabilize the desirable traits; the stabilized plants that can be propagated and "come true" (remain identical to the parent plant) are given a cultivar name and released into production to be used by farmers.

Rodents

A laboratory mouse or rat strain is a group of animals that is genetically uniform. Strains are used in laboratory experiments. Mouse strains can be inbred, mutated, or genetically modified, while rat strains are usually inbred. A given inbred rodent population is considered genetically identical after 20 generations of sibling-mating. Many rodent strains have been developed for a variety of disease models, and they are also often used to test drug toxicity.

Insects

The common fruit fly (Drosophila melanogaster) was among the first organisms used for genetic analysis, has a simple genome, and is very well understood. It has remained a popular model organism for many other reasons, like the ease of its breeding and maintenance, and the speed and volume of its reproduction. Various specific strains have been developed, including a flightless version with stunted wings (also used in the pet trade as live food for small reptiles and amphibians).

See also

 Genetic isolate
 Clone (cell biology)
 Race (biology)
 Variant (biology)

References

External links 
 Coli Genetic Stock Center
 EcoliWiki E. coli strain index
 International Mouse Strain Resource (IMSR)
 Rat strain index

Microbiology terms
Virology
Taxa by rank
Infraspecific virus taxa